Lydy Louisy-Joseph (born 14 April 1978 in Vénissieux, a suburb of Lyon, France), better known by the shorter name Louisy Joseph, is a French singer of Martinique origin. She first joined the French series of Popstars as part of the girl band L5, and since 2008 has been performing as a solo singer.

Career
Lydy Louisy Joseph left school early at age 15 to pursue a musical career while continuing hotel studies in Lyon. In 2001, she took part the Lyon musical comedy Salammbô, in the role of Zelda, the fighting woman.

Popstars and L5 

In 2001, she applied as Lydy Louisy-Joseph at the Paris auditions of Popstars in its first season in France broadcast on M6 television station and was picked as a finalist to be part of the girl group L5 where she was mostly known as Lydy. The winning group released their epomynous album, L5 that was certified diamond in 2002. as was the debut single "Toutes les femmes de ta vie" from the album. The follow-up singles from the album did well. Their second album Retiens-moi was certified platinum

Solo career 
In 2006, as the popularity of L5 diminished, the band announced Lydy's departure. Louisy Joseph started preparing for a debut solo album after a friend advised her to contact Pascal Obispo who agreed to produce her album at his Atlético Music studios, and arranged for a contract with Warner Music France with contributions by John Mamann and Olivier Reine in a soul, reggae and acoustic style far away from the pop style of L5. She also chose to adopt the name Louisy Joseph rather than her full name Lydy Louisy-Joseph, effectively distancing herself from "Lydy of L5" days.

Her debut solo album La saison des amours was released on 14 April 2008, the day she turned 30. Her debut solo single "Assis par terre", written by Lionel Florence, was released on 26 May 2008 and hit Top 3 followed by a concert at the Zénith de Nantes, on the occasion of the NRJ Music Tour. In 2008, she was an opening act for Christophe Maé and performed a solo concert with William Baldé at Élysée Montmartre, on 23 June 2008. Her follow-up single, "Mes insomnies" referred to her suffering from insomnia. That was followed by "Imagine de John Lennon" which was a reggae tribute to the artist John Lennon. In September 2008, her album was certified silver. In 2009 she organized a long French tour visiting many smaller venues.

Her second album Ma radio was released on 9 July 2012 with "Chante" being her first single from the album with a music video shot in the deserts of California.

In late 2014 she became a contestant on the fifth season of TF1's Danse avec les stars.

Her third album "Music" was released on 18 December 2015.

Personal life
She is born to parents of Martinique origin and has two sisters, Peggy, her senior and Kelly her junior, and a brother Weedy.

Discography

Albums 
Studio albums

Singles 

Featured in

References

External links 
  
Myspace
Essentiel-LouisyJoseph website

People from Vénissieux
1978 births
Living people
Popstars winners
Participants in French reality television series
21st-century French singers
21st-century French women singers